is a Japanese volleyball player who plays for the NEC Red Rockets. She also played for the Japan women's national volleyball team.

Career 
Satō was born in Yamagata City, Yamagata Prefecture. She became a volleyball player at 7 years old, and played as Libero at 13 years old.</ref>

While attending the Yamagata Municipal Commercial High School, Her team won fifth place at the national highschool tournament. In April 2011 Satō joined Shokei Gakuin University, her team qualified National Sports Festival and Empress's Cup in October 2014.

On 31 October 2014 Toyota Auto Body Queenseis announced her joining. She is the first premier league player from Shokei Gakuin's alumnus.

On 6 April 2015 she was selected as a member of Japan women's national volleyball team, Satō competed 2015 FIVB Volleyball World Grand Prix and 2015 FIVB Volleyball Women's World Cup.</ref>

On 1 August 2019 NEC Red Rockets announced her joining the club.

Clubs 
  Takiyama Sports Club
  Yamagata Municipal Dairoku Junior High School
  Yamagata Municipal Commercial High School
  Shokei Gakuin University (2011-2015)
  Toyota Auto Body Queenseis (2015-2018)
  NEC Red Rockets (2019-)

National team
 2015 - 2015 FIVB Volleyball Women's World Cup (5th place)

References 

Japanese women's volleyball players
Sportspeople from Yamagata Prefecture
1993 births
Living people